Angelika Volquartz (born 2 September 1946 in Uelzen, Lower Saxony) is a German politician. She was the mayor of Kiel from 2003 to 2009. She was the first Kiel's female mayor.

References

1946 births
Living people
People from Uelzen
Christian Democratic Union of Germany politicians
Members of the Bundestag 2002–2005
Members of the Bundestag 1998–2002
Mayors of places in Schleswig-Holstein
Women mayors of places in Germany
21st-century German women politicians
Recipients of the Cross of the Order of Merit of the Federal Republic of Germany
20th-century German women